Regina Carla Bautista Peralejo-Bonifacio (born March 7, 1981), better known as Rica Peralejo is a Filipino actress, singer, and television host.

Career

Television
Peralejo started out as a child star and was part of ABS-CBN's popular youth oriented variety show Ang TV.  Peralejo appeared in Gimik. She was also cast as part of the hit horror series !Oka Tokat. Her acting prowess was finally recognized as she became a staple in ABS-CBN's teleseryes such as Mula sa Puso, Marinella, Kay Tagal Kang Hinintay, Sineserye Presents: Palimos ng Pag-ibig, Sa Piling Mo and Pangarap na Bituin. She was also part of the hit sitcoms Palibhasa Lalake, Oki Doki Doc and OK Fine Whatever. She also honed her hosting skills as a host for the showbiz oriented show Showbiz No. 1 and a segment host for Umagang Kay Ganda. She was also hailed as a Dancing Queen with her Rated R segment in the Philippines' longest running variety show ASAP. 

Rica has appeared in several episodes of Komiks, Star Magic Presents, Philippine TV's longest running drama anthology Maalaala Mo Kaya and her own mini-anthology via Star Drama Presents: Rica. Recently, Rica has appeared in guest roles on 100 Days to Heaven and Ikaw ay Pag-Ibig and became a guest judge on several occasions on It's Showtime. In 2015, Peralejo hosted Mommy Hacks.

Music
Peralejo also embarked on a singing career and has released two solo albums.

Personal life
Peralejo studied at the School of the Holy Spirit during her early years. She graduated from the Ateneo de Manila University with a degree in AB Literature.

Peralejo is married to Joseph "Joe" Bonifacio, a pastor of Every Nation Church. They have two sons together.

Filmography

Television

Film

Discography

Albums

Awards and nominations

References

External links

1981 births
Living people
Filipino child actresses
Filipino film actresses
Ateneo de Manila University alumni
People from Quezon City
Actresses from Metro Manila
ABS-CBN personalities
Star Magic
GMA Network personalities
Viva Artists Agency
Manila Bulletin people
21st-century Filipino singers
21st-century Filipino women singers